The 2018–19 Coupe de France preliminary rounds made up the qualifying competition to decide which teams took part in the main competition from round 7. This was the 102nd season of the main football cup competition of France. The competition was organised by the French Football Federation (FFF) and was open to all clubs in French football, as well as clubs from the overseas departments and territories (Guadeloupe, French Guiana, Martinique, Mayotte, New Caledonia (qualification via 2018 New Caledonia Cup), Tahiti (qualification via 2017–18 Tahiti Cup), Réunion, Saint Martin and Saint Pierre and Miquelon).

Overseas departments and territories

French Guiana

These matches were played on 21 October 2018.

Note: French Guiana League structure (no promotion to French League structure):Regional 1 (R1)Regional 2 (R2)

Mayotte

This match was played on 13 October 2018.

Note: Mayotte League structure (no promotion to French League structure):Régionale 1 (R1)Régionale 2 (R2)Régionale 3 (R3)

Guadeloupe

These matches were played on 23 and 24 October 2018.

Note: Guadeloupe League structure (no promotion to French League structure):Ligue Régionale 1 (R1)Ligue Régionale 2 (R2)Ligue Régionale 3 (R3)

Martinique

These matches were played on 23 and 24 October 2018.

Note: Martinique League structure (no promotion to French League structure):Régionale 1 (R1)Régionale 2 (R2)Régionale 3 (R3)

Réunion
These were played on 27 and 28 October 2018.

Note: Reúnion League structure (no promotion to French League structure):Régionale 1 (R1)Régionale 2 (R2)

Nouvelle-Aquitaine

These matches were played on 27 and 28 October 2018.

Pays de la Loire

These matches were played on 27 and 28 October 2018.

Centre-Val de Loire

These matches were played on 27 October 2018.

Corsica

These matches were played on 27 and 28 October 2018.

Bourgogne-Franche-Comté
 
These matches were played on 27 and 28 October 2018.

Grand Est

These matches were played on 27 and 28 October 2018.

Méditerranée

These matches were played on 27 and 28 October 2018.

Occitanie

These matches were played on 27 and 28 October 2018.

Hauts-de-France

These matches were played on 27 and 28 October 2018.

Normandy

These matches were played on 27 and 28 October 2018.

Bretagne

These matches were played on 27 and 28 October 2018.

Paris-Île-de-France

These matches were played on 27 and 28 October 2018.

Auvergne-Rhône-Alpes

These matches were played on 27 and 28 October 2018.

References

Preliminary rounds